Tipula luna is a species of true cranefly.

Distribution
Widespread throughout the West Palaearctic.

References

External links
BioLib

Tipulidae
Diptera of Europe
Insects described in 1879